Aleksandr Kornilov may refer to:
Aleksandr Kornilov (historian) (1862–1925), Russian historian and liberal politician
Aleksandr Kornilov (rower) (born 1985), Russian Olympic rower